Glycochenodeoxycholic acid is a bile salt formed in the liver from chenodeoxycholic acid and glycine, usually found as the sodium salt. It acts as a detergent to solubilize fats for absorption.

References 

Bile acids
Cholanes